The Humbert La Moto Du Ciel (Motorbike of the Sky) is a French ultralight aircraft, designed and produced by Humbert Aviation of Ramonchamp, introduced in the mid-1980s. The aircraft is supplied as a complete ready-to-fly-aircraft.

Design and development
The aircraft complies with the Fédération Aéronautique Internationale microlight rules. It features a strut-braced high-wing, a two-seats-in-tandem open cockpit with a windshield, fixed tricycle landing gear and a single engine in pusher configuration.

The aircraft fuselage is made from welded steel tubing, with the tailboom left uncovered. The flying surfaces are made from aluminium sheet, with a foam core. Standard engines available are the  Rotax 582 two-stroke, the  Rotax 912UL, the  Rotax 912ULS four-stroke powerplants. Kits for aerial application are also available.

Specifications (La Moto Du Ciel)

References

External links

1980s French ultralight aircraft
Homebuilt aircraft
Single-engined pusher aircraft
Humbert Aviation aircraft